Cosmin Marian Bîrnoi (born 17 September 1997) is a Romanian professional footballer who plays as a midfielder for SSU Politehnica Timișoara.

References

External links
 
 

1997 births
Living people
Romanian footballers
Association football midfielders
Liga I players
Liga II players
ACS Poli Timișoara players
FC Politehnica Iași (2010) players
FC Viitorul Constanța players
FCV Farul Constanța players
SSU Politehnica Timișoara players
Sportspeople from Hunedoara